Kirsty Pealling (born 14 April 1975) is a former footballer who spent her entire club career with Arsenal Ladies. She also represented England at full international level.

Club career
Pealling attended Haggerston School and was spotted by Arsenal Ladies manager Vic Akers during a five-a-side tournament when she was 13. At the time of her retirement in 2006, Pealling was the club's longest serving player, the record appearance holder and had won the most trophies. She won domestic trebles with Arsenal in 1993 and 2001.

Pealling worked as a sports development officer for Camden Council and since 2004 has coached at Hampstead FC.

When Jayne Ludlow retired in July 2013, the legendary Welsh midfielder paid tribute to "unsung hero" Pealling in an interview with the Arsenal website: "I should really thank Kirsty because when I was scoring 30 goals a season, it was mostly because of her crosses from the right wing."

International career
Eighteen-year-old Pealling made her England debut in a 3–0 Euro 1995 qualifying win in Belgium in November 1993. She also featured in the eventual semi-final defeat to Germany. However, Pealling and Joanne Broadhurst were controversially dropped from the 1995 FIFA Women's World Cup squad, with manager Ted Copeland saying "They are not international footballers at this level."

After a long spell out of international football, Pealling returned as a substitute against Denmark in August 2001. In May 2004 she played the first half of a 1–0 friendly win over Iceland at London Road, Peterborough.

Honours

Arsenal

FA Cup: 1998–99

References

1975 births
Living people
Footballers from the London Borough of Hackney
English women's footballers
Arsenal W.F.C. players
England women's international footballers
FA Women's National League players
Women's association football fullbacks